Arnaud II de La Porte (born, Versailles, 14 October 1737; guillotined Paris, 23 August 1792) French statesman, Minister of the Marine, Intendant of the King's Civil List (Minister of the Royal Household).

Early life and career

Born at Versailles from a family steeped in the traditions of the palace, de La Porte (or de Laporte) was destined early to follow in the family footsteps. His great-granduncle was Michel Richard Delalande, court composer to Louis XIV, his grandfather was First Commissary of the Marine Joseph Pellerin, his father Arnaud I de La Porte was First Commissary as well, and his uncle, Joseph Pellerin Jr. was Intendant of the Naval Armies, all under Louis XV and Louis XVI.¹

He began working in his father's bureau in 1755 at only eighteen years of age. The next year he joined his uncle at the Marine (as the Navy was known in France). He would continue in these branches of the government occupying at various times Intendancies of Brest and Bordeaux, arriving at the Intendancy of Foreign and Maritime Trade in 1783.

The Revolution

Named Minister of the Navy during the Baron de Breteuil's ephemeral ministry on 12 July 1789, after the fall of the Bastille two days later he immediately emigrated to Spain. However Louis XVI needed faithful servants more than ever, and when the King called, La Porte was one of the few who dared answer. He was named Intendant of the Civil List (Minister of the Royal Household) in December 1790 which gave him direct control of the large sums of money that were considered the private wealth of the King and so not subject to public audit. He soon became a close confidant of the beleaguered king and Louis XVI entrusted him with great sums of this private money to be distributed toward the moderation of the rapidly radicalising revolutionary fervour. More than 1500 persons; actors, singers, public speakers, etc. were employed to this end, at an expense which exceeded 200,000 livres monthly. In 1791 La Porte founded the "National" Club in the Carrousel. Despite his close collaboration with Mirabeau, and especially due to the latter's premature death, La Porte's efforts proved to be in vain.

Seeing how dangerous things were becoming, La Porte, who conferred on a daily basis with the King in his apartments in the Pavillon de l'Infante of the Louvre (which were attached by a long wing to the Tuileries Palace at that time), proposed a plan to his sovereign in an attempt to save his life. He had previously discovered a secret room in his suite, and knowing that the guards would not take notice of his passage since he made the same walk every day, counselled the King to hide in the secret room after their daily conference until such a time as he could be safely spirited out of the whole palace complex. At that time Louis refused, still certain of the love of his people. The Queen's friend, Fersen would be more successful in convincing him of his need to escape a few months later. When the royal family attempted the flight to Varennes, Laporte was left behind, entrusted by the King to read his letter explaining his motives to the Constituent Assembly, something that must have been a thankless, not to say extremely dangerous task.

Caught near the border, the royal family was unceremoniously returned to Paris to face the music. The King's position deteriorated steadily after that. After the storming of the Tuileries on 10 August, La Porte was arrested for having distributed secret funds, and convicted of treason against the Revolution becoming, on 23 August 1792, the second political victim of that new humane device: the guillotine. In a macabre gesture, his severed head was then presented to the King, by then imprisoned in the Temple, as a grisly birthday gift.

His services and ultimate sacrifice were recalled after the Restoration by the King's younger brother who had been crowned as Louis XVIII, and his son Arnaud III de La Porte was created a baron in recognition of all this in 1822. The title remains in the family to this day.

(based on the Dictionnaire Biographique Universel, article by Louis-Mayeul Chaudon and Antoine-François Delandine, translated with background interpolations and additions by R.Sekulovich)

Biographical essay

(translated from the "Dictionnaire historique ou Histoire abrégée des hommes qui se sont fait un nom par la génie, les talens, les vertus, les erreurs, depuis le commencement du monde jusqu’à nos jours. --François Xavier de Feller, 12 vol in-8º, Paris, 1818."):

Laporte (Arnaud de), born in 1737 of a family which over the last century had provided several intendants and chief administrators to the Navy and the Colonial Office, he was destined to follow the same career. The Jesuits, with whom he did his studies at the Collège Louis Le Grand, had hoped to acquire him for their company; but the young Laporte did not heed their hints, though he was always to retain feelings of attachment and veneration for his former masters.

At an early age (he was barely 23 years old), he was given the task of directing construction in the ports of Calais and Boulogne, of flat-bottomed boats, of a kind which, since they were ultimately to prove useless, have become the objects of ridicule by the English but which had for quite some time been the subject of their liveliest anxiety. In the fulfilment of his duties, Laporte exercised those talents and that energy which were ever to focus public attention upon him.

Having been rapidly promoted through the intermediary ranks, he was soon appointed Controller of the Navy at Brest. This posting's modest title belies its vast responsibilities; it was in fact a senior posting. He soon made for himself a personal reputation which public opinion, ratified by the full confidence of his superiors, led to his gradual assumption of all the functions of the Intendancy, of which he would one day actually hold the title as well.

When his father died in 1770, Laporte went up to Paris to succeed him at the Exchequer, thus becoming the magistrate of a Sovereign Court and as such could no longer remain the mere controller of the port of Brest. In order for the Navy to be able to retain his services he was appointed Ordinator of Bordeaux, a post which gave him direct access to the Minister of the Navy which was a rôle much more in keeping with his newly elevated rank. It was at this time that he began to lay the foundations of that double reputation of a virtuous man as well as an able administrator which was to particularly characterise him.

It is from this time as well that one can date that universal concert of approbation both from the Navy and the Merchant Marine as well as from shipping magnates in every port who all championed him for the office of Minister of the Navy each time that post became vacant. M. de Sartine was appointed Minister in 1775, and no sooner was he in office than he hastened to nominate Laporte to the king for the Intendancy of Brest, at that time vacant.

Soon after, in 1776, an order came down changing the structure of the administration of the ports, by which several aspects were now to fall under the purview of the military. Although the new Intendant disapproved of some of these changes, having foreseen and reported several inconveniences likely to come of them, he nevertheless set himself to implement them inonfidence he inspired in general, that Laporte was in great part responsible for the rapid expansion of the French Navy during the period of the War of American Independence, this in spite of the innumerable difficulties that the execution of the new order entailed.

The port of Brest during the course of this war was, as the principal French naval base, the nerve centre of almost all operations. Arnaud de Laporte who was its very soul soon gathered the fruits of his labours in expressions of esteem from the multitudes of travellers who passed through, expressions to which the king's brother the Count of Artois deigned to join his own. This prince would henceforward honour Laporte with his most particular grace.

M. de Castries, having become Naval Minister in 1780 immediately called Laporte to his side and gave him, under the title of Intendant General of the Navy, the direction of all matters remaining under Administrative Corps. In 1783 he was called to the Royal Council of State as Master of Requests and at the same time appointed Intendant of Maritime Commerce, Intendant of the Navy, and a member of the Naval Council which the Minister had formed around his person.

Then the Revolution began, and in July 1789 the king appointed a new ministry, calling on Arnaud de Laporte to take on the portfolio of the Navy at last. He was at that moment in Paris which was in full insurrection. The courier on his way from Versailles carrying his nomination as Minister of the Navy was arrested at the barriers set up around the city and taken to the City Hall where the electors had constituted themselves. Luckily there were among them some well-intentioned men who saw to it that the courier and his despatches was allowed to continue without the contents of his attaché being examined, and it is thanks to them that Laporte was not subjected to the fury of the enraged populace then and there.

Louis XVI, who had been unable to approach him in person at the time, finally got the chance eighteen months later in December 1790 when, come to name his new Intendant of the Civil List decided upon Laporte for the job. The latter was however no longer in France, having emigrated to Vitoria, near Bilbao in Spain which is where he received the king's letter, and though he had no doubts as to the danger to which he would expose himself, without a moment's hesitation he hastened to the service of a master who had found him worthy, and who lost no time in coming to appreciate the value of his servant.

Over the next year and a half, Laporte had few occasions to give public proof of his devotion to his king. Circumstances required him to appear to be buried in purely financial matters obeying the king's wishes, whose confidence and affection in any event gave his heart all the reward he could hope for. Louis XVI soon gave him proof of his feelings when a pamphlet was published at the beginning of 1791 which accused his Intendant of weakness and even incompetence. The king, under no illusion as to the real aim of this slander which was getting a great deal of publicity at the time, was the first to go and speak to Laporte of it. His Intendant immediately offered his resignation if the king did not feel his services had been adequate, to which the Louis responded " Would you too, wish to leave me then?" Laporte, deeply moved, threw himself at his master's knees, and at that moment his fate was irrevocably sealed.

Whether because the king was satisfied with Laporte's account of his work, or because the ever-mounting danger of being in the king's service kept even the most ambitious from seeking such a post, in any event Laporte was able to hold onto the king's confidence. It was this close collaboration with Louis XVI that led a great many people to come into contact with him, some no doubt in hope of acquiring an entrée with the king in the event that royal authority might eventually be restored, others with perhaps purer motives. All took him for their mediator with the king to whom, via Laporte they communicated their expressions of affection and zeal to serve him. After the tenth of August Laporte's first care was to destroy all evidence of this correspondence. That his retiring behaviour was not a sign of timidity in Laporte is shown by the fact that every time it was his duty to appear in public he did so with great courage.

One reads in the accounts of the day that when he was called upon to appear before the National Assembly to present the declaration the king had prepared before the royal family's flight to Varennes, he refused to disclose the letter his unfortunate master had written him which he regarded as a sacred trust which he would not violate. He was equally firm when called upon to explain what had become of the "Memoires" of Madame de La Motte of which the entire edition had been bought up by the king so it could be suppressed. It had been decided that the books would be burnt in their entirety in the furnaces of the Sèvres porcelain factory. Laporte, assigned to oversee this operation (which he had considered a mistake in the first place), nevertheless undertook the task out of duty and discipline, feeling that such a delicate matter had to be seen to properly.

It is known that Louis XVI, departing from Paris in 1791 was headed for Montmédy where he would centre his provisional government. A new ministry was envisioned. The Baron de Breteuil was to be Prime Minister and Laporte was to join it as Minister of the Navy. This second appointment was to have no more result than the first, and was even less known since every effort was made after the failure of the king's flight to play down all details regarding the oppositional government's plans.

On the tenth of August, Laporte, fearing that his absence might compromise the king took it to be his duty to remain at his post. He went home that evening and there received a deputation of two jacobin envoys upon which he was obliged to present himself before the National Assembly to deposit the registers of the Civil List for their review. He replied calmly to the interrogation he was then subjected to, and surprisingly his point of view carried the day.

Four more days passed without any attacks upon his person, however during that time he had to suffer the search of his papers by Commissioners of the National Assembly. To their disappointment no incriminating materials were discovered among them. Despite their best efforts not to omit anything that might produce their desired results, even to the point of removing chimney stones and pulling up the floorboards of his apartment, not a single piece of evidence was found that might have incriminated anyone at all.

The care taken by this good man, who in so much personal danger himself, still took the pains not to compromise all those who had been in correspondence with him shows one of the character traits of Arnaud de Laporte which has sadly largely been ignored by posterity. Too many with too much to lose had good reason to keep him in oblivion, and so it wasn't until many years later that a few of those who were saved by his actions on that day were able to come forward in their memoires to express their belated gratitude and pay homage to his memory.

The confidence that he enjoyed and which he so clearly showed to be well merited as in this instance, had made his network of contacts very numerous, and even the times he regretted having had to meet with them.

But all that he did remained largely unknown, an inevitable consequence of the circumstances in the midst of which he was acting, which as a man of experience he knew to be of the highest delicacy. Nevertheless, he continued to perform these thankless tasks with all the constancy of a man of real character who had no need of the approbation of others in the fulfilment of his duty. Some others held in the king's heart and would have been frustrated to appear to be held away from that close coterie that had surrounded Louis XVI which both friends and enemies of the king were vainly striving to force their way into.

But Arnaud de Laporte, faithful to that wise spirit of discretion which he had made his creed, affected to remain always at a remove from the buzzing throng that whirled around the king's person. Everyone knew what he was about, and understood his firm principles, and that understanding led them to feel deep gratitude towards him. He had no personal enemies, and as such he probably would not have been singled out to become one of the Revolution's first victims had not the cold calculations of the leaders of the movement required them to find someone of "great guilt" to sacrifice in order to stoke the fires of public fury.

It is quite clear that Laporte would not have been chosen to open up the abominable series of judicial murders which was to be the prelude to the more wholesale slaughter of 25 September, except that the persons upon whom the revolutionaries’ eyes had first fallen had for the most part already made their escape from the capital or were being reserved for an even crueller fate.

It was on 15 August 1792, at the very time the Royal Family was being transported to prison at the Temple, that this faithful servant of the crown was taken to the City Hall to be interrogarted by Billaud-Varennes, and from there transported to the Abbey of St. Germain des Près, then in use as a revolutionary prison.

On the 23rd he appeared before the Revolutionary Tribunal. His calm countenance and the precision and accuracy of his responses to questioning stymied his judges best efforts to justify the guilty verdict they were required to make. "Why can’t you judge him?" cried the angry mob which had gathered to wallow in the spectacle of this just man's calvary. For‚ in the eyes of this ignorant multitude, especially with tempers at fever-pitch, no judgement, no justice was possible except the death sentence.

Still the interrogation dragged on and on, for the rest of the day of the 23rd, through the whole night and for the morning after. And yet, surprisingly, after all that, such a great impression had he made upon his judges by his evident virtue, that they found themselves divided, and could not get the required majority vote for a condemnation, as was later reported by M. Julienne, the lawyer who had the courage to take on the dangerous job of defending Laporte. Nevertheless, they were bound by the powers over them and circumstances to condemn him and this they ultimately managed to bring themselves to do.

When Arnaud de Laporte heard his sentence, he had a momentary shudder of emotion, which he made no attempt to conceal without however showing any weakness. His faith, this religion which he'd always respected, so full of hope and consolation in adversity gave him the courage to remain calm without affectation, which made a deep impression upon all who witnessed it, including the judges who had just condemned him.

The imprint of his peaceful religious feelings has remained in a letter he wrote just after his sentencing which has been kept by his descendants. It is a very model of simple Christianity which resonates with submission to divine will and tenderness for his loved ones. The great impression he made at that moment, at first known only to those sharing the Tribunal with him, soon spread far and wide, this hommage to his dignity under duress, this respect due his courage at this terrible moment was reported unanimously by all the Parisian newspapers on the next day.

One history of the Revolution which appeared in 1797, called "Two Friends of Liberty" closes its account of his death as follows: "Calm, as was his conscience, he climbed the steps of the guillotine to meet his death with all the assurance of a man who had never used his life but to bring happiness to all who surrounded him". No-one, in fact, ever took the practice of private virtues farther than Arnaud de Laporte which was the best guarantee possible one could have for his public probity in office. Also, the esteem in which he was held by those who came to know him and even those who knew him only slightly was always accompanied by a genuine sentiment of affection.

His affability and good nature had won him all hearts back in Brest. During a long and grave illness in 1780 while posted there, the sailors of the port would gather daily at the door of the Intendancy eager for any scrap of news as to how he was faring, and thirty years after his death, when an oldtimer from Brest was asked if he had known Arnaud de Laporte the codger could not bring himself to answer, so overcome was he with tears of emotion.

Arnaud de Laporte left only one son, a squadron chief in the artillery of the Royal Guard.

1737 births
1792 deaths
People from Versailles
French Naval Ministers
Ancien Régime office-holders
People of the French Revolution
French people executed by guillotine during the French Revolution
18th-century French people